This is a list of the main career statistics of Austrian professional tennis player Dominic Thiem. To date, Thiem has won seventeen ATP singles titles, including at least one title on each surface (hard, clay and grass). He won the 2020 US Open title, and has reached three other Grand Slam finals at the 2018 French Open,  2019 French Open and 2020 Australian Open. He has also been in two Grand Slam semifinals at the 2016 French Open and 2017 French Open. He won the 2019 Indian Wells Masters and was a finalist at the 2017 and 2018 Madrid Open, semifinalist at the 2017 Italian Open, 2018 Paris Masters and 2019 Madrid Open and a quarterfinalist at the US Open in 2018 and at the French Open in 2020. Thiem achieved a career high singles ranking of world No. 3 on 2 March 2020.

Career achievements 

At the 2014 US Open, Thiem advanced to the fourth round of a Grand Slam for the first time but lost in straight sets to sixth seed Tomáš Berdych. The following year, he reached his first ATP Masters 1000 quarterfinal at the Miami Open, where he lost to eventual runner-up Andy Murray in three sets. Later that year, Thiem won the first three ATP singles titles of his career at the Open de Nice Côte d'Azur, Croatia Open Umag and Swiss Open with wins over Leonardo Mayer, João Sousa and David Goffin in the finals.

In February 2016, Thiem won his fourth ATP singles title at the Argentina Open, defeating top seed and defending champion Rafael Nadal en route after saving a match point in the third set. In the same month, he won his first ATP 500 title, and first title on hard court at the Abierto Mexicano Telcel, beating Bernard Tomic in the final. At the French Open, Thiem achieved his best Grand Slam result so far by advancing to the semifinals where he fell to the world No. 1 and eventual champion Novak Djokovic. He followed this up with his first title on grass at the MercedesCup, saving two match points against top seed Roger Federer en route. His strong performances throughout the year allowed him to qualify for the year-ending ATP World Tour Finals for the first time, where he scored his only win in the round robin stage against Gael Monfils. He finished with a career high year-end ranking of eighth.

Thiem began 2017 by reaching the fourth round of the Australian Open for the first time but lost to Goffin in a rematch of their third round match from the previous year. After falling at the quarterfinal stage in three of his past five tournaments, he won his first title of the year and second ATP 500 title at the Rio Open without dropping a set. He then went on to reach his first Masters 1000 final in the Madrid Masters before losing to Rafael Nadal in a tight straight set battle. He would reach the semifinals of the French Open for the second year running beating Novak Djokovic in the process before losing in straight sets to Nadal.

In 2020, Thiem won his first Grand Slam title at the 2020 US Open, defeating Alexander Zverev in a fifth-set tiebreak after being two sets down, becoming the first player to win a Grand Slam from this position since 2004 and the first at the US Open since Pancho Gonzales in 1949. 2020 was Thiem's most successful season, ending the year ranked 3rd and having reached the finals of two out of the three Grand Slams that took place.

Performance timelines

Singles
Current through the 2023 Indian Wells Masters.

Doubles

Grand Slam finals

Singles: 4 (1 title, 3 runner-ups)

Other significant finals

Year-end championships

Singles: 2 (2 runner-ups)

ATP Masters 1000 finals

Singles: 3 (1 title, 2 runner-ups)

Doubles: 1 (1 runner-up)

ATP career finals

Singles: 28 (17 titles, 11 runner-ups)

Doubles: 3 (3 runner-ups)

ATP Challengers and ITF Futures finals

Singles: 14 (7 titles, 7 runner-ups)

ITF Junior Circuit finals

Singles: (11 titles, 1 runner-up)

Doubles: (3 titles, 3 runner-ups)

National participation

Davis Cup (10–8)

Best Grand Slam results details

Record against top-10 players

Thiem's match record against players who have been ranked in the top 10, with those who are active in boldface. Only ATP Tour main draw matches are considered.

|-bgcolor=efefef class="sortbottom"
|align=left|Number 1 ranked players||colspan=8|

 

|-bgcolor=efefef class="sortbottom"
|align=left|Number 2 ranked players||colspan=8|

|-bgcolor=efefef class="sortbottom"
|align=left|Number 3 ranked players||colspan=8|

|-bgcolor=efefef class="sortbottom"
|align=left|Number 4 ranked players||colspan=8|

|-bgcolor=efefef class="sortbottom"
|align=left|Number 5 ranked players||colspan=8|

|-bgcolor=efefef class="sortbottom"
|align=left|Number 6 ranked players||colspan=8|

|-bgcolor=efefef class="sortbottom"
|align=left|Number 7 ranked players||colspan=8|

|-bgcolor=efefef class="sortbottom"
|align=left|Number 8 ranked players||colspan=8|

  

|-bgcolor=efefef class="sortbottom"
|align=left|Number 9 ranked players||colspan=8|

|-bgcolor=efefef class="sortbottom"
|align=left|Number 10 ranked players||colspan=8|

Top-10 wins 
He has a  record against players who were, at the time the match was played, ranked in the top 10.

Career Grand Slam tournament seedings

The tournaments won by Thiem are bolded.

*

ATP Tour career earnings

*Statistics correct .

Exhibitions

Tournament finals

Singles

References

External links 

 
 
 

Thiem, Dominic
Sport in Austria